Isabelle Maree Kelly (born 20 September 1996) is an Australian rugby league footballer who plays for the Sydney Roosters in the NRL Women's Premiership and the Central Coast Roosters in the NSWRL Women's Premiership.

Background
Born in Gosford, New South Wales, Kelly played her junior rugby league for the Berkeley Vale Panthers. Her father, Ken, played for the Manly Warringah Sea Eagles in the 1980s, while her brother, Dylan, played for Manly's under-20 side.

Playing career
In 2015, Kelly made her debut for New South Wales, scoring their only try in a 4–all draw with Queensland.

In 2017, she was a member of the Jillaroos 2017 Women's Rugby League World Cup winning side, scoring the first try in the final against New Zealand.

In June 2018, Kelly was announced as one of fifteen marquee signings by the Sydney Roosters women's team which will participate in the inaugural NRL Women's Premiership in September 2018.

On 22 June 2018, Kelly scored two tries for New South Wales in their Women's State of Origin win over Queensland and was awarded the Nellie Doherty Medal for Player of the Match.

In Round 1 of the 2018 NRL Women's Premiership, Kelly made her debut for the Sydney Roosters, starting at centre and scoring her side's only try in their 10–4 loss to the New Zealand Warriors.

On 10 September 2018, she was named the NSWRL Women's State of Origin Player of the Year at the Brad Fittler Medal awards in Sydney. In November 2018, she became the inaugural winner of the Women's Golden Boot Award.

On 27 September 2020, Kelly captained the Central Coast Roosters to an undefeated win of the NSWRL Women's Premiership.

During the NRLW game between St. George Illawarra Dragons and Brisbane Broncos on 10 October 2020, Kelly was involved in an incident in which Broncos player Amber Hall pulled her hair and tackled her. Landing on her ankles, she suffered from a syndesmosis injury and was aided by crutches temporarily.

References

External links
St George Illawarra Dragons profile

1997 births
Living people
Australian female rugby league players
Sportswomen from New South Wales
Australia women's national rugby league team players
Rugby league centres
Sydney Roosters (NRLW) players
St. George Illawarra Dragons (NRLW) players